Koenoem is an Afro-Asiatic language spoken in Plateau State, Nigeria. It is spoken in about 6 villages east of the Panyam-Shendam road.

Notes

Further reading
A Sociolinguistic Profile of the Koenoem (kcs) Language of Plateau State, Nigeria

Languages of Nigeria
West Chadic languages